Center of the Universe is an American sitcom television series created by Nat Bernstein and Mitchel Katlin, that aired on CBS from October 27, 2004 until January 19, 2005. The show was cancelled after 10 episodes aired. It was set in downtown Tulsa, Oklahoma.

John Goodman starred as John Barnett, a good-natured and successful operator of a security company.  Spencer Breslin plays his nutty, nerdy 12-year-old son.  The series involved the dependency of his entire family (except his wife, but including his parents) on John for everything—money, jobs, housing, and personal guidance in every decision.

Tagline: "The world doesn't revolve around John...but his family does."

A total of 15 episodes were produced.

Cast
 John Goodman as John Barnett 
 Jean Smart as Kate Barnett 
 Spencer Breslin as Miles Barnett
 Olympia Dukakis as Marge Barnett
 Diedrich Bader as Tommy Barnett
 Melinda McGraw as Lily Barnett
 Ed Asner as Art Barnett

Episodes

References

External links
 

2000s American sitcoms
2004 American television series debuts
2005 American television series endings
CBS original programming
Television series by CBS Studios
Television series by Warner Bros. Television Studios
Television shows set in Tulsa, Oklahoma